Mary Watson Whitney (September 11, 1847 – January 20, 1921) was an American astronomer and for 22 years the head of the Vassar Observatory where 102 scientific papers were published under her guidance.

Early life and education 

Whitney was born on September 11, 1847, in Waltham, Massachusetts. Her mother was Mary Watson Crehore and her father was Samuel Buttrick Whitney. Her father was successful in real estate and wealthy enough to provide her with a good education for a woman at the time. She went to school in Waltham where she excelled in mathematics and graduated from the public high school in 1863. She was privately tutored for one year before she entered Vassar College in 1865, where she met the astronomer Maria Mitchell. During her time at Vassar College, her father died and her brother was lost at sea. She obtained her degree in 1868.

From 1869 to 1870, she took some courses about quaternions and celestial mechanics by Benjamin Peirce (at Harvard). At the time, women could not be admitted to Harvard so she attended as a guest. She obtained her master's degree from Vassar in 1872, afterwards she went to Zürich for 3 years where she studied mathematics and celestial mechanics.

Professional career 

Returning to the US, she became a teacher at her hometown high school until she became an assistant of Maria Mitchell in Vassar. In 1888 upon the retirement of Mitchell she became a professor and the director of the observatory there until she retired in 1915 for health reasons.

During her career, she concentrated on teaching and research related to double stars, variable stars, asteroids, comets, and measurements by photographic plates. Under her direction, 102 articles were published at the Vassar Observatory. In 1889, her mother and sister both became ill and Whitney moved them to the Observatory where she could care for them and continue her work part-time. When they died two years later, she resumed full-time work.  Whitney was a fellow of the American Association for the Advancement of Science and a charter member of the Astronomical and Astrophysical Society. When the Maria Mitchell Association was established in Nantucket, Massachusetts in 1902, Whitney became its first president.

Whitney believed that science provided strong career opportunities for women. She hoped that women would soon become more active in practical chemistry, architecture, dentistry, and agriculture, which were more lucrative and, in Whitney’s view, particularly well suited to women. Moreover, she believed that scientific training would prepare them to be good mothers, falling into more traditional tropes of the early 20th century. She also funded the advancement of women in science. In 1908, when an observatory was built on Nantucket, Whitney raised money to fund a female research fellow. In her will, she bequeathed $5,000 to Vassar to support research by women.

Later life

Whitney died in Waltham on January 20, 1921, of pneumonia.

References

External links
Whitneygen.org

American women astronomers
1847 births
1921 deaths
Harvard University alumni
Vassar College alumni
Vassar College faculty